Oleh Orekhov is a Ukrainian football player.

Career
Oleh Orekhov is started his career in 2008 with Ros Bila Tserkva. In summer 2009 he moved for one season with Desna Chernihiv, the main club of Chernihiv. In 2010 he moved to Lviv then he returned to Desna Chernihiv until 2013. In 2012 he played also 2 matches for Olimpik Donetsk. In summer 2013 he moved to Tytan Armiansk.

Honours
Desna Chernihiv
 Ukrainian Second League: 2012–13

References

External links 
 Oleh Orekhov footballfacts.ru
 Oleh Orekhov allplayers.in.ua
 

1990 births
Living people
FC Desna Chernihiv players
FC Ros Bila Tserkva players
FC Lviv players
FC Olimpik Donetsk players
FC Tytan Armyansk players
Ukrainian footballers
Ukrainian Premier League players
Ukrainian First League players
Ukrainian Second League players
Association football defenders